The Semaphore state by-election, 1973 was a by-election held on 2 June 1973 for the South Australian House of Assembly seat of Semaphore. This was triggered by the death of state Labor MHA Reg Hurst. The seat had been retained by Labor since it was created and first contested at the 1970 state election.

Results
The Socialist Party, who contested the previous election on 3.7 percent of the vote, did not contest the by-election. Labor easily retained the seat.

See also
List of South Australian state by-elections

References

South Australian state by-elections
1973 elections in Australia
1970s in South Australia
June 1973 events in Australia